Venice Borkhorsor (born April 6, 1950 in Nakhon Phanom) is a boxer from Thailand. He obtained the WBC World Flyweight Title on September 29, 1972 by defeating Betulio González in Bangkok, Thailand in a tenth round TKO and later defeating the Lineal Flyweight Champion Erbito Salavarria. He vacated the title following his last fight against Julio Guerrero on July 10, 1973.

Borkhorsor attempted unsuccessfully to take the World Bantamweight Title on October 13, 1973 from Rafael Herrera, losing in a fifteen round split decision on October 15, 1973.

In his career, he had an astounding .63 knockout percentage, a figure that was even higher in his first year of competition.  His dominance and quick rise to fame may have been partially explained by his southpaw stance.

Boxing career
Borkhorsor was a warrior with a strong punch. He won 49 of 57 bouts and scored 36 knockouts. During his career, he won the WBC Flyweight Championship of the World, his first and most prestigious title, the OPBF Bantamweight Championship, the Bantamweight Championship of Thailand and the Flyweight Championship of Thailand.

His Manager, Chana Supkaew brought him along with brilliant planning, mentoring him with great achievement and very few losses.

Borkhorsor started his more competitive boxing career in Bangkok around May 1968, in his first year obtaining seven knockouts in his first nine fights.  In his first five years of fighting, he lost only one of his more competitive matches.

His single loss in his early career was against Patjai Srijantopas in his first attempt at the Thai flyweight title.  He lost the ten round bout on points in Bangkok on May 31, 1969, only one year into his career fighting in Bangkok.

In his second attempt, Borkhorser won the Thai flyweight title on July 1970, at the age of 21 by defeating Ratanasak Vayupak in a ninth round TKO on July 17, 1970 in Bangkok, Thailand.

Later career and retirement from boxing
He held the OPBF Bantamweight title on February 11, 1975, when he defeated Bok-soo Hwang in a ninth round knockout in Bangkok.

He took the Thai Bantamweight title on July 27, 1979 from Duanesan Lukklongjan in a seventh round knockout in Bangkok, Thailand.

His single loss by knockout in the fourth round against Detkat Kiatboonyong, holder of the Thai Bantamweight title, on January 22, 1980 may have precipitated his retirement.  He retired with an exceptional record from more competitive boxing in August 1980, at the age of only thirty.

See also 
Lineal championship
List of WBC world champions
List of WBA world champions
List of flyweight boxing champions

References

External links 
 
Venice Borkhorsor - CBZ Profile

1950 births
Flyweight boxers
World boxing champions
World flyweight boxing champions
Venice Borkhorsor
Venice Borkhorsor
Living people
Venice Borkhorsor